Shirol Taluka is located in Kolhapur district, Maharashtra, India with its headquarters in Shirol.

References

Cities and towns in Kolhapur district
Talukas in Maharashtra